The lira AOI was a special banknote circulating in Italian East Africa (Africa Orientale Italiana, or AOI) between 1938  and 1941.

Data

When Fascist Italy imposed the Italian lira in Ethiopia in 1936, it decided upon a rate of 3 lire = 1 thaler. Ethiopians were obliged by law to change their coins and banknotes but considering that the thaler was a silver coin with a value 28 times higher than the lira, they began to hide them to retain the metal value. The Italian government declared this practice illegal, but in 1938 issued a new banknotes "lira AOI" at a better rate of 4.5 lire = 1 thaler for citizens who would willingly exchange their silver coins at the Bank of Italy. 

Very few people accepted this and in 1939 they were offered a second possibility at a rate 5 lire = 1 thaler. In Italian Somaliland, the lira was already circulating. In Ethiopia, the lira replaced the Ethiopian thaler (issued  by the Bank of Ethiopia) whilst in Eritrea it replaced the Eritrean tallero, a silver coin minted in Italy. It also briefly replaced the East African shilling in British Somaliland under Italia occupation between 1940 and 1941, when the lira AOI was offered at a rate 13 lire = 1 thaler. 

The lira AOI was seen as a possible bribery, and it was immediately replaced by the East African shilling in 1941, when the United Kingdom gained control of Italy's colonies, at the rate of 1 shilling = 24 lire. The banknotes retired by the British government were later used by the British Army when it occupied Italy between 1943 and 1945, producing with the AM-lira a high inflation in the country.

Banknotes

In 1938, banknotes were issued for use in Italian East Africa in denominations of 50, 100, 500 and 1000 lire. The designs were the same as those used on Italian notes but the colours of the notes were different and they bore an overprint with the words "Serie Speciale Africa Orientale Italiana". A relic of the lira was the use even in the 1960s of the expression "Lix Lira" (=six lira) for 25 cents.

References

Bibliography
 Mauri, Arnaldo (1967). Il mercato del credito in Etiopia, Giuffrè, Milano 1967. [in Italian]
 Tuccimei, Ercole (1999). La Banca d'Italia in Africa, Presentazione di Arnaldo Mauri, Laterza, Bari,  [in Italian]

External links
 

Currencies of Somalia
Modern obsolete currencies
1938 establishments in the Italian Empire
1941 disestablishments in the Italian Empire
Lira